The New Moscow is a 1938 Soviet sci-fi comedy film directed by Aleksandr Medvedkin and Aleksandr Olenin. It was banned from showing by Joseph Stalin.

Plot 
The film tells about the adventures of the young designer Alyosha, who made a living model of the future capital of the Soviet Union, his relationship with his beloved girlfriend Zoya and the relations between the painter Fedya and the pig-tender Olya.

Accompanied by his grandmother, Alyosha travels to Moscow to display his model at a prestigious show.

Cast
 Daniil Sagal as Alyosha
 Nina Alisova as Zoya
 Mariya Barabanova as Olya
 Nikolay Pajitnov as Misha Kozhevnikov
 Pavel Sukhanov as Fedya Utin
 Maria Blumenthal-Tamarina as granny
 Aleksandr Grave as student (uncredited)
 Karandash as cameo
 Lidiya Smirnova as a girl  (uncredited)

References

External links 

1938 films
1930s Russian-language films
Soviet science fiction comedy films
1938 comedy films
Soviet black-and-white films
Mosfilm films
1930s science fiction comedy films

Censored films